Conasprella  fenzani is a species of sea snail, a marine gastropod mollusk in the family Conidae, the cone snails and their allies.

These cone snails are predatory and venomous. They are capable of "stinging" humans, therefore live ones should be handled carefully or not at all.

Description
The size of the shell attains 47 mm.

Distribution
This species occurs in the Pacific Ocean off Panama.

References

 Tenorio M.J., Tucker J.K. & Chaney H.W. (2012) The families Conilithidae and Conidae. The cones of the Eastern Pacific. In: G.T. Poppe & K. Groh (eds), A conchological iconography. Hackenheim: Conchbooks. page(s): 27
  Puillandre N., Duda T.F., Meyer C., Olivera B.M. & Bouchet P. (2015). One, four or 100 genera? A new classification of the cone snails. Journal of Molluscan Studies. 81: 1-23

External links
 To World Register of Marine Species
 

fenzani
Gastropods described in 2011